Bogusław L. Jackowski (born 13 April 1950), also known as "Jacko", is a Polish computer scientist, typographer, publisher, and amateur musician. He is best known for his work on the TeX typesetting system, the Latin Modern font family, and the TeX Gyre project.

Biography 
Jackowski was born in Gdańsk, Poland in 1950. He graduated from Częstochowa's No. 4 High School (Lyceum) named in honor of Henryk Sienkiewicz in 1967 and from the Chemical Engineering Department of Gdańsk University of Technology in 1972.

He began his career as a programmer at the computer center of Gdańsk University, then became an assistant in the Mathematics Department. In the early 1980s he moved to the Institute of Water Building at the Polish Academy of Sciences.

In 1992, along with Marek Ryćko, he founded the publishing house Do, which in 1995 published the book Kabaret Starszych Panów, Tom I, containing records of the first four evenings of the cabaret. At the beginning of 1998 he resigned from the co-ownership of the publishing house and devoted himself to work in BOP , since 1993 a Gdańsk-based company providing graphic and publishing services – conducted with Piotr Pianowski. BOP, among other things, graphically prepared and printed the series of albums Był sobie Gdańsk and six issues of the quarterly magazine of the same title.

He is a founding member of the Polish TeX Users Group (GUST), and since 1995 an Honorary Member of the Association. Within the activities undertaken by GUST, he actively participates in the development of the computer typesetting of free software public domain and Polish fonts. Together with Janusz M. Nowacki he is the author of the Latin Modern family of Computer Modern-based fonts. Also with Nowacki and Piotr Strzelczyk he is the author of the electronic version of the Antykwa Półtawskiego font, called by some as the "Polish national font". He also runs the TeX Gyre project, which resulted in Unicode OpenType fonts and mathematical extensions for some of them.

Jackowski has authored many articles in specialist magazines and some regular columns in popular periodicals, some of which have been anthologized in the computer science collection Notes on the Balloon.

He is the holder of seven of Donald Knuth's certificates.

Bibliography 
 
 
 
 
 
 
 
 Sokołowski S., Jackowski B., Janota E., Fuglewicz P. Towards Statistically-based Semantics of Linguistic Resources. „Workshop on International Proofing Tools and Language Technologies, July 1-2, 2004, Patras, Greece”, 2004.

References

Notes

External links 
 

Polish typographers and type designers
Polish computer scientists
Musicians from Gdańsk
People from Gdańsk
1950 births

Living people